The United States Department of Commerce (DOC) is an executive department of the U.S. federal government concerned with creating the conditions for economic growth and opportunity. Among its tasks are gathering economic and demographic data for business and government decision making, and helping to set industrial standards. Its main purpose is to create jobs, promote economic growth, encourage sustainable development and block harmful trade practices of other nations. It is headed by the Secretary of Commerce, who reports directly to the President of the United States and is a member of the president's Cabinet. The Department of Commerce is headquartered in the Herbert C. Hoover Building in Washington, D.C.

History

Organizational history
The department was originally created as the United States Department of Commerce and Labor on February 14, 1903. It was subsequently renamed the Department of Commerce on March 4, 1913, as the bureaus and agencies specializing in labor were transferred to the new Department of Labor.

Since its creation, the Commerce Department has seen various agencies and administrative offices shift in and out of its organizational structure. The United States Patent and Trademark Office was transferred from the Interior Department into the Commerce Department in 1925. The Federal Employment Stabilization Office existed within the department from 1931 to 1939. In 1940, the Weather Bureau (now the National Weather Service) was transferred from the Agriculture Department, and the Civil Aeronautics Authority was also merged into the Commerce Department. In 1949, the Public Roads Administration was added to the department after the Federal Works Agency was dismantled.

In 1958, the independent Federal Aviation Agency was created and the Civil Aeronautics Authority was abolished. The United States Travel Service was established by the United States Secretary of Commerce on July 1, 1961, pursuant to the International Travel Act of 1961 (75 Stat. 129; 22 U.S.C. 2121 note) The Economic Development Administration was created in 1965. In 1966, the Bureau of Public Roads was transferred to the newly created Department of Transportation. The Minority Business Development Agency (MBDA) was created on March 5, 1969, originally established by President Richard M. Nixon as the Office of Minority Business Enterprise.
The National Oceanic and Atmospheric Administration (NOAA) was created on October 3, 1970.

The Cabinet Council on Commerce and Trade was one of multiple Cabinet Councils established in the United States on or about February 26, 1981 by the Reagan Administration.

2020 data breach
In 2020, the Department of Commerce suffered a data breach following a cyberattack likely conducted by a nation state adversary, possibly Russia.

Herbert Hoover as secretary of commerce

Herbert Hoover was appointed Secretary of Commerce in 1921 by then-President Warren G. Harding. Hoover was, by far, the most active secretary in the history of the department until the end of his position in 1928.

After his election as president in 1920, Warren G. Harding rewarded Hoover for his support, offering to appoint him as either Secretary of the Interior or Secretary of Commerce. Secretary of Commerce was considered a minor Cabinet post, with limited and vaguely defined responsibilities, but Hoover, emphasizing his identity as a businessman, accepted the position. In sharp contrast to the Interior Department, there were no scandals at Commerce.

Hoover envisioned the Commerce Department as the hub of the nation's growth and stability.  His experience mobilizing the war-time economy convinced him that the federal government could promote efficiency by eliminating waste, increasing production, encouraging the adoption of data-based practices, investing in infrastructure, and conserving natural resources. Contemporaries described Hoover's approach as a "third alternative" between "unrestrained capitalism" and socialism, which was becoming increasingly popular in Europe.  Hoover sought to foster a balance among labor, capital, and the government, and for this he has been variously labeled a "corporatist" or an associationalist.

Hoover demanded, and received, authority to coordinate economic affairs throughout the government. He created many sub-departments and committees, overseeing and regulating everything from manufacturing statistics to air travel. In some instances he "seized" control of responsibilities from other Cabinet departments when he deemed that they were not carrying out their responsibilities well; some began referring to him as the "Secretary of Commerce and Under-Secretary of all other departments."  In response to the Depression of 1920–21, he convinced Harding to assemble a presidential commission on unemployment, which encouraged local governments to engage in countercyclical infrastructure spending.  He endorsed much of Mellon's tax reduction program, but favored a more progressive tax system and opposed the treasury secretary's efforts to eliminate the estate tax.

Radio and travel

When Hoover joined the department, almost no families had radios; when he became president in 1929, 10 million owned one, and most of the rest listened in a nearby home, store or restaurant. Hoover's department set the policies that shaped the entire new industry.  Hoover's radio conferences played a key role in the organization, development, and regulation of radio broadcasting. Hoover also helped pass the Radio Act of 1927, which allowed the government to intervene and abolish radio stations that were deemed "non-useful" to the public. Hoover's attempts at regulating radio were not supported by all congressmen, and he received much opposition from the Senate and from radio station owners.

Hoover was also influential in the early development of air travel, and he sought to create a thriving private industry boosted by indirect government subsidies. He encouraged the development of emergency landing fields, required all runways to be equipped with lights and radio beams, and encouraged farmers to make use of planes for crop dusting. He also established the federal government's power to inspect planes and license pilots, setting a precedent for the later Federal Aviation Administration.

As Commerce Secretary, Hoover hosted national conferences on street traffic collectively known as the National Conference on Street and Highway Safety. Hoover's chief objective was to address the growing casualty toll of traffic accidents, but the scope of the conferences grew and soon embraced motor vehicle standards, rules of the road, and urban traffic control. He left the invited interest groups to negotiate agreements among themselves, which were then presented for adoption by states and localities. Because automotive trade associations were the best organized, many of the positions taken by the conferences reflected their interests. The conferences issued a model Uniform Vehicle Code for adoption by the states, and a Model Municipal Traffic Ordinance for adoption by cities. Both were widely influential, promoting greater uniformity between jurisdictions and tending to promote the automobile's priority in city streets.

Other Hoover initiatives

With the goal of encouraging wise business investments, Hoover made the Commerce Department a clearinghouse of information. He recruited numerous academics from various fields and tasked them with publishing reports on different aspects of the economy, including steel production and films. To eliminate waste, he encouraged the standardization of products like automobile tires and baby bottle nipples. Other efforts at eliminating waste included reducing labor losses from trade disputes and seasonal fluctuations, reducing industrial losses from accident and injury, and reducing the amount of crude oil spilled during extraction and shipping. He promoted international trade by opening overseas offices to advise businessmen. Hoover was especially eager to promote Hollywood films overseas.

His "Own Your Own Home" campaign was a collaboration to promote ownership of single-family dwellings, with groups such as the Better Houses in America movement, the Architects' Small House Service Bureau, and the Home Modernizing Bureau. He worked with bankers and the savings and loan industry to promote the new long-term home mortgage, which dramatically stimulated home construction. Other accomplishments included winning the agreement of U.S. Steel to adopt an eight-hour workday, and the fostering of the Colorado River Compact, a water rights compact among Southwestern states.

Foreign economic policy
The department has always been involved in promoting international non-financial business. It stations commercial attachés at embassies around the world. Currently, the key sub-agencies are the International Trade Administration, and the Bureau of Industry and Security. The ITA provides technical expertise to numerous American companies, helping them adjust to foreign specifications. It provides guidance and marketing data as well.  The Office of Export Enforcement administers export controls, especially regarding the spread of nuclear technology and highly advanced electronic technology. Under the administration of President Donald Trump, the policy has been to restrict high-technology flows to China. From 1949 to 1994, the department worked with the 17-nation Coordinating Committee on Multilateral Export Controls, which restricted technological flows to the Soviet Union and other communist nations. Since 1980, the Commerce Department works to neutralize the dumping of exports or the subsidies of overseas production. Along with the export controls, this work continues to generate friction with other nations. On July 20, 2020, the commerce department announced adding eleven Chinese firms to an export blacklist for committing human rights abuse against Uyghur Muslims and other ethnic minorities in Xinjiang by conducting genetic analysis on them. Two of the firms sanctioned were subsidiaries of BGI Group, a Chinese genetic sequencing, and biomedical firm. In the same year October, the BGI Group firm was again named in the alleged exploitation of medical samples of patients testing for Covid-19 in Nevada using the 200,000 rapid testing kits donated by the United Arab Emirates under its AI and cloud computing firm, Group 42. The Emirati firm, also known as G42, has previously been named in the mass surveillance of people via an instant messaging application called ToTok, which was actually a spy application snooping on user data.

Current organization

Structure

Budget and finances
The Department of Commerce was authorized a budget for Fiscal Year 2015 of $14.6 billion. The budget authorization is broken down as follows:

Reorganization proposals

Proposals to reorganize the department go back many decades. The Department of Commerce was one of three departments that Texas governor Rick Perry advocated eliminating during his 2012 presidential campaign, along with the Department of Education and Department of Energy. Perry's campaign cited the frequency with which agencies had historically been moved into and out of the department and its lack of a coherent focus, and advocated moving its vital programs into other departments such as the Department of the Interior, Department of Labor, and Department of the Treasury. The Economic Development Administration would be completely eliminated.

On January 13, 2012, President Barack Obama announced his intentions to ask the United States Congress for the power to close the department and replace it with a new cabinet-level agency focused on trade and exports. The new agency would include the Office of the United States Trade Representative, currently part of the Executive Office of the President, as well as the Export-Import Bank of the United States, the Overseas Private Investment Corporation, the United States Trade and Development Agency, and the Small Business Administration, which are all currently independent agencies. The Obama administration projected that the reorganization would save $3 billion and would help the administration's goal of doubling U.S. exports in five years. The new agency would be organized around four "pillars": a technology and innovation office including the United States Patent and Trademark Office and the National Institute of Standards and Technology; a statistical division including the United States Census Bureau and other data-collection agencies currently in the Commerce Department, and also the Bureau of Labor Statistics which would be transferred from the Department of Labor; a trade and investment policy office; and a small business development office. The National Oceanic and Atmospheric Administration (NOAA) would be transferred from the Department of Commerce into the Department of the Interior. Later that year, shortly before the 2012 presidential election, Obama invoked the idea of a "secretary of business" in reference to the plan. The reorganization was part of a larger proposal which would grant the president the authority to propose mergers of federal agencies, which would then be subject to an up-or-down Congressional vote. This ability had existed from the Great Depression until the Reagan presidency, when Congress rescinded the authority.

The Obama administration plan faced criticism for some of its elements. Some Congress members expressed concern that the Office of the United States Trade Representative would lose focus if it were included in a larger bureaucracy, especially given its status as an "honest broker" between other agencies, which tend to advocate for specific points of view. The overall plan has also been criticized as an attempt to create an agency similar to Japan's powerful Ministry of International Trade and Industry, which was abolished in 2001 after some of its initiatives failed and it became seen as a hindrance to growth. NOAA's climate and terrestrial operations and fisheries and endangered species programs would be expected to integrate well with agencies already in the Interior Department, such as the United States Geological Survey and the United States Fish and Wildlife Service. However, environmental groups such as the Natural Resources Defense Council feared that the reorganization could distract the agency from its mission of protecting the nation's oceans and ecosystems. The plan was reiterated in the Obama administration's FY2016 budget proposal that was released in February 2015.

See also 

 Bureau of Industry and Security
 Commerce Department trade mission controversy
 Title 13 of the Code of Federal Regulations
 Title 15 of the Code of Federal Regulations
 Title 19 of the Code of Federal Regulations
 USA.gov

References

Further reading
 Brandes, Joseph. Herbert Hoover and Economic Diplomacy: Department of Commerce Policy, 1921–1928. (U of Pittsburgh Press, 1970).
 Clements, Kendrick A.The Life of Herbert Hoover (Palgrave Macmillan, 2010) pp. 209–38.
 Cohen, Stephen D., and Stephen David Cohen. The making of United States international economic policy: principles, problems, and proposals for reform (Greenwood, 2000).
 Hawley, Ellis. "Herbert Hoover, the Commerce Secretariat, and the Vision of an 'Associative State', 1921–1928". Journal of American History, (June 1974) 61#1 : 116–40 online
 Lee, David D. "Herbert Hoover and the Development of Commercial Aviation, 1921–1926." Business History Review 58.1 (1984): 78–102.
 Seely, Bruce E. "Engineers and Government–Business Cooperation: Highway Standards and the Bureau of Public Roads, 1900–1940." Business History Review 58.1 (1984): 51–77.
 Weems, Robert E., and Lewis A. Randolph. "'The Right Man': James A. Jackson and the Origins of US Government Interest in Black Business." Enterprise & Society 6.2 (2005): 254–77.

External links 

 
 Department of Commerce on USAspending.gov
 Department of Commerce in the Federal Register
 Department of Commerce reports and recommendations from the Government Accountability Office
 US Commercial Service
 Department of Commerce Representation in the UK

 
Government agencies established in 1913
Commerce
1913 establishments in Washington, D.C.
Economy ministries
Tourism ministries